Gromnik or Gromovnik is a translated work of an astrological persuasion that was in circulation in ancient Russia. It belonged to fortune-telling and "renounced" books. It is known from the lists of the XV-XVI centuries of Serbian writing and contains various omens arranged by months (about the state of the weather, about future harvests, illnesses, armies, etc.), connected with thunder and earthquake; sometimes notes “on the state of the moon right or hollow” are added to this work, indicating the significance of such signs at different times of the year.

Definition 
"Gromniks" contain forecasts about natural disasters, crop yields, the behavior of wild animals and social phenomena (epidemics, unrest, wars in different countries) depending on the appearance of thunder in each of the twelve lunar months of the year. Judging by the "Gromnik" from the manuscript of the RSL. Muses. No. 921, which reproduces the table of the movement of the sun according to the signs of the zodiac, in the ancient Russian manuscripts of Gromnik, we could also talk about the months of the Julian, and not the lunar year.

The possibility assumed in "Gromnik" to have a judgment about the success of a person’s economic activity depending on the signs of thunder, despite the unsuitability of individual predictions for Ancient Russia (and focused on the South Slavic climate), determined the popularity and prevalence of this type of fortune-telling literature (as indicated by the circle of interests of the Cyril scribe Euphrosynus, who rewrote the article “And this is the sign of thunder” in one of his collections).

Some editions of "Gromnik" presumably influenced the emergence of another fortune-telling book - "Molniyannik" (from molniya, 'lightning'). In this work, among the signs by which predictions are made, the outlines of lightning, the day of the month and the places where lightning strikes are named. Fortune-telling of the Molniyannik is timed to movements according to the signs of the zodiac of the Sun, and not the Moon. Some researchers see the reason for this in the syncretic appearance of the supreme deity of the clear sky Zeus (and on Slavic-Russian soil - Perun and Yarila-Dazhdbog), which combined the features of the thunder gods and the solar deity.

Editions

References

See also 
 Volkhovnik

East Slavic literature
Divination
Superstitions